Birdman Aircraft was a U.S. aircraft manufacturer that marketed the Birdman TL-1 ultralight in the 1970s and early 1980s, at the time, the lightest aircraft to have ever flown. The firm was based at the Daytona Beach International Airport in Florida.

References
 

Defunct aircraft manufacturers of the United States
Defunct manufacturing companies based in Florida